XHEOH-FM is a radio station on 96.1 FM in Camargo, Chihuahua, Mexico. The station is owned by 10 members of the Salayandia García family and carries a grupera format known as La Jefa.

History
XHEOH began as XEOH-AM 1270, receiving its concession on March 25, 1976. It was owned by Belém Arriaga Muro. By the 1990s, XEOH had moved to 750 kHz.

It migrated to FM in 2011.

References

Radio stations in Chihuahua